The 1908 American Cup was the annual open cup held by the American Football Association. The West Hudsons won the tournament for the second time in three years defeating the Paterson True Blues in the final as they did in 1906.

Entries

Semifinals

Final

Paterson True Blues: GK Garside, DF Bissett, Murray, MF Fletcher, McKinstrie, Beattie, FW Mantell, Allan, Cooper, Gilmore, Elliott.
West Hudson A.A.: GK Hanlon, DF Breckie, Kettles, MF Miller, Sedon, Lawson, FW Dean, Knowles, Colville, Lennox, Carter.

Amer
American Cup